Nathan Williams (born 5 October 1983) is a Welsh rugby union player, who was a Wales Under-21 international. He played for Llanelli, Narberth, Moseley and  the Newport Gwent Dragons regional team.

References 

1983 births
Living people
Dragons RFC players
Rugby union players from Haverfordwest
Welsh rugby union players
Rugby union props